Malongkeng (马龙坑; also Malukeng 马陆坑, 马鹿坑) is a religious site located south of Yuanjia'ao, China, dedicated to the Zhouji Dragon King.  The site is revered by villagers of the surrounding hills and the greater Fenghua area for its spring waters. 

Donations are periodically made to Xianling Temple (显灵庙), which guards the site. According to tradition, the Dragon King went to the aid of imperial troops in the Ming Dynasty and was honoured by the Jiajing Emperor by edict. From that time onwards pilgrims from around Fenghua have made their way to Malongkeng to ask favours of the Dragon King. 

A colorful folk religious festival is held annually at Malongkeng on the 18th day of the sixth lunar month, which is said to be the birthday of the Zhouji Dragon King.  At that time tens of thousands of people make the trip to Malongkeng and roads up the mountain become extremely congested. 

In July 2004, the Fenghua municipal government banned the festival, citing danger from fire in the surrounding forest.  Authorities described the festival as "superstition" and said measures taken against it would promote civilisation and social stability.  In late July traffic to 
Malongkeng was not allowed to proceed and the Xianling Temple was temporarily closed down.

Buildings and structures in Ningbo
Religion in Zhejiang